A  is a single person who lives with their parents beyond their late 20s or early 30s to enjoy a more carefree and comfortable life. In Japanese culture, the term is especially used when negatively describing young unmarried women.

Etymology
The expression parasaito shinguru was first used by Professor Masahiro Yamada of Tokyo Gakugei University in his bestselling book , published in October 1999. The catchy phrase quickly found its way into the media and is now a well-known expression in Japan.

Professor Yamada subsequently coined the related term parasite couple to refer to married children living with the parents of one partner. However, this situation occurs less frequently and the term parasite couples is less well known. This is a traditional Japanese living arrangement, though its prevalence has decreased in recent years.

Dynamics
This situation allows the children to live in considerable comfort, and while many save money, others spend all their income on luxury items, traveling, and other non-essential expenses. Many children wish to live with their parents until they marry.

The parents, for their part, often enjoy living with their children. Many parents want to protect their children and offer them the best possible start in life. Parents also enjoy the company and the social interaction and try to maintain the relationship. The additional expenses for the parents due to the additional household member are usually small, as the fixed costs such as rent must be paid regardless, and the additional cost for food and other consumables is sometimes negligible. Many parents also see this as an investment in their future, as the children will be more obliged to take care of their parents in their old age (in Japan, it is traditional that children care for their elderly and disabled parents).

Japanese women 
A growing number of young women are remaining unmarried in Japan today, a development often viewed as a rebellion against the traditional confines of women's restrictive roles as wives and mothers. The percent of Japanese women still single in their twenties was 30.6% in 1985 and 54% in 2004.

Young women's lifestyles instead center on friends, work, and spending disposable income; unmarried Japanese adults typically live with their parents, thus saving on household expenses and increasing the amount of money available to spend on their own entertainment. Sociologist Masahiro Yamada gave these young adults the label "parasitic singles." Some young women reacted by creating business cards with their names and the title "Parasite Single" on them. Japanese media has given heavy coverage to the decline in Japan's birthrate, but the trend continues.

Causes
There is a sense of community to sharing a home with other people in general. Life in modern societies has become more physically isolated. Japan is at the extreme of this spectrum, with much of life revolving around workplace interactions. The multi-generation home living arrangement is only considered unusual relative to the standards of the late 20th century and early 21st century. Many view this as a result of consumer-economics stigma which favors economic competition above personal enrichment, enjoyment and appreciation of life. The aspect of young people not working  mirrors other things that are often considered economic parasitism in some ways.  People who make a distinction between this and the types of things often labeled as economic parasitism point out that in Japan and the United States, the older generations currently dominate the mid and high level work positions. Supporters of this view argue that the phenomenon as the inevitable result of a rebellion in reaction to a rapidly changing world in which the powerful forces of society simultaneously condemn young people for lacking ambition, while seeking to limit their freedom them without much prospect for fulfilling, balanced lives, nor even physical security in the intermediate future.

The housing costs in Japan are notoriously high, especially in or near large cities. A parasite single who chose to live independently would, on average, lose 2/3 of their disposable income. Furthermore, they would also have to do cleaning and cooking for themselves. Finally, establishing a household has a large up-front cost for durable items, e.g. a refrigerator, furniture, washing machine, and other items. The security deposit, traditional monetary gift for the landlord ("key money"), and the housing agent fee can also easily reach six months' rent; this is non-refundable and must be paid in advance. In summary, becoming independent involves large expenses, work, and a significant drop in living standard. Furthermore, as the vast majority of the Japanese population is concentrated in cities, all the employment and entertainment options desired are within reach from the parental home.

The economic advantages are enjoyed by all types of parasite singles, although there are different subgroups. Career oriented young salarymen, career women, and office ladies could afford to live on their own, but prefer the financial benefits, and perhaps the company and security, of living at home.

Often, they can only find part-time and low-paid jobs, turning into underemployed, so-called freeters, who cannot afford to live independently, regardless of whether they would like to or not. Finally, some do not want to face the competition of the outside world at all, and so, do not seek work, and, in extreme situations, try to not even leave their parents' house. These people are referred to as hikikomori (people who withdraw from society, literally to "withdraw into seclusion").

Genda Yuji, associate Professor of the Institute of Social Science (University of Tokyo), widened the perspective from the rise of so-called "parasite singles" through proposing a socioeconomic-driven view, strongly connected to the collapse of bubble economy, and the inability of the country's employment system to react after the crisis:

Social impact

One possible side-effect of the parasite single phenomenon is the increase of the average age of the first marriage (though this is also attributable to other factors, such as career prospects and education). While in 1970, Japanese women married on average at age 24 and men at age 27, by 2002, this had increased to 27.4 years for women and 29 years for men. This has also resulted in women having children later in life, and fewer children overall due to the decline in fertility after age 30. Subsequently, while in 1983 there were on average 1.8 children born to every woman over her lifetime, this has decreased to 1.22 children per woman in 2008.

Similar arrangements outside Japan 
These lifestyles are not confined to Japanese society; similar arrangements can also be found in other cultures. In Italy, parasite singles were offensively called bamboccioni ("grown-up big spoiled babies") in 2007 by former minister Tommaso Padoa-Schioppa, voluntarily ignoring the situation of a considerable part of the 20- to 30-year-old population. In post-communist Central Europe, the phenomenon is more accepted, possibly due to socio-economic reasons and soaring housing prices. In English-speaking nations, the term "basement dweller" has connotations that imply a person lives with their parents because they do not have enough money to move out, and if they had enough money would be living on their own.

A different concept of parasite single is found in Brazil, where some individuals are said to have a Paitrocínio (a wordplay between the words pai/father and patrocínio/sponsorship). This word is used not for the ones living in their parents' homes, but for the ones who did leave home, but still rely solely, or majorly, on their parents' financial support. The reasons for leaving home before achieving financial independence vary, but mostly it is due to college or to start a career with small or uncertain initial incomes, such as in arts and sports.

See also
Japanese social phenomena:
 The Anatomy of Dependence, Japanese book
 Family policy in Japan
 herbivore men
 hikikomori
 Japanese family
 Marriage in Japan
 Working women in Japan

General:
 Boomerang Generation
 incel
 NEET
 singleton (lifestyle)
 sub-replacement fertility

References

External links
In the UK: Adult kids 'fail to leave home'
Unable or Unwilling to Leave the Nest? – Discussion paper by Mariko Tran in the electronic journal of contemporary japanese studies
Parasites in Prêt-à-Porter

Society of Japan
Japanese family structure
Economy of Japan
Demographics
Demographics of Japan
Poverty in Japan
1999 neologisms
Pejorative terms for people